Maigret is a British television series from ITV. It is an adaptation of the books by Georges Simenon featuring his fictional French detective Jules Maigret, played by Rowan Atkinson. The series is set in France in the mid-1950s. Its first episode aired on 28 March 2016 and the second on Christmas Day, 2016. A second series (also of two episodes) aired during 2017. It was reported in 2018 that the series had been cancelled. 

The series premiered in the United States on 31 August 2019 on Ovation.

Rowan Atkinson, who plays Jules Maigret, is a notable fan of the books saying, "I have been a devourer of the Maigret novels for many years and I'm very much looking forward to playing such an intriguing character at work in Paris during a fascinating period in its history."

Series overview

Cast
Rowan Atkinson as Chief Inspector Jules Maigret
Lucy Cohu as Madame Maigret
Shaun Dingwall as Inspector Janvier
Leo Staar as Inspector Lapointe
Mark Heap as Doctor Moers
Hugh Simon as Dr. Paul (three episodes)
Colin Mace as Insp. Lognon (two episodes)
Aidan McArdle  as Judge Comeliau (three episodes)

Production

Series 1

The episodes were mainly filmed on location in Budapest and Szentendre, Hungary, which stood in for 1950s Paris.

Series 2

Prior to the second episode's airing on 17 June 2016 and after the popularity of the first, ITV commissioned two further episodes, production of which took place between November 2016 and February 2017.

Episodes

Series 1 (2016)

Series 2 (2017)

References

External links

2016 British television series debuts
2017 British television series endings
2010s British drama television series
Television shows based on Belgian novels
2010s British crime television series
ITV television dramas
British detective television series
Television shows based on works by Georges Simenon
English-language television shows
Television shows filmed in Budapest
2010s British mystery television series
Television series set in the 1950s
Television shows set in Paris